Mercedes AMG High Performance Powertrains (previously known as Ilmor Engineering and Mercedes-Benz High Performance Engines) is a Formula One engine manufacturer, owned by Mercedes-Benz.

Their engines have won ten Formula One Constructors' Championships and eleven Drivers' Championships. Beside those Formula One constructors, the company currently supplies road-legal engines for the Mercedes-AMG ONE sports car.

Background

Ilmor was founded by Mario Illien and Paul Morgan in 1983, as an independent British Formula One engine manufacturer. The company name was taken from the surnames of the founders. It originally started building engines for IndyCars with the money of IndyCar team owner and chassis manufacturer Roger Penske.

Daimler-Benz (later known as Daimler) acquired General Motors' 25% share of Ilmor in 1993. In 2002, Daimler increased its share to 55% and renamed the company Mercedes-Ilmor. In 2005, it became the sole owner of Ilmor and renamed the company first to Mercedes-Benz High Performance Engines, then to Mercedes-Benz HighPerformanceEngines. In December 2011, the company was renamed to Mercedes AMG High Performance Powertrains along with the renaming of Mercedes GP to incorporate the Mercedes-AMG sub-brand.

At the same time, the small Special Projects part of the company, which between 2003 and 2011 had been contracted to co-develop, co-assembly, arrangement, preparation and tune up Honda's IndyCar Series engines, split away to become a separate company, owned by Mario Illien and Roger Penske. This new company, which is totally independent of Mercedes, is once again known as Ilmor Engineering Ltd.

History

In 1991, Ilmor entered Formula One as the engine supplier to the Leyton House team (formerly March). In 1992, Leyton House changed its name back to March and continued using Ilmor engines. Ilmor also delivered engines to Tyrrell Racing in that year. Powered by an Ilmor V10, March scored 3 points, and Tyrrell 8 points.

Ilmor already had a good name in F1, and so the Sauber sportscar-team and Mercedes-Benz that were planning their Formula One entrance together signed a deal with Ilmor to produce racing engines for them. However, Mercedes stepped back from the project with the engines only carrying the slogan "Concept by Mercedes-Benz" and the engines were officially called "Saubers".

However, after an unexpectedly fast performance in 1993, Sauber convinced Mercedes to enter officially in 1994. In 1994, Ilmor also supplied the new Pacific GP team of Keith Wiggins with the old 1993 spec engines. Pacific only managed to qualify seven times in thirty-two attempts, although the engine was not implicated in this poor display.

Ilmor became the Mercedes's trusted engine builder partner and assembler to McLaren in 1995 after Ilmor decided to reposition its Formula One involvement by ceasing its independent engine supply program. The partnership took its first win at the 1997 Australian Grand Prix.

In 2001, Paul Morgan was killed whilst landing his vintage aeroplane at Sywell Aerodrome, Northamptonshire. This led to Mercedes-Benz increasing their financial involvement in Ilmor, with the company being renamed Mercedes-Ilmor Ltd.

The new Formula One regulations in 2014 saw Mercedes produce a hybrid 1.6-litre turbocharged V6 engine, which features both a kinetic energy recovery system and a heat energy recovery system. The Mercedes engine started the season with a clear advantage, with Mercedes-engined cars scoring the majority of the points. Since the introduction of the new engine formula, Mercedes-powered cars have achieved pole position in 121 out of 184 races as of the 2023 Saudi Arabian Grand Prix, and have won 114 out of 184 races during this period.

In March 2020, in light of the delayed seasons due to the COVID-19 pandemic, and working with UCL Mechanical Engineering and Institute of Healthcare Engineering, Mercedes HPP announced that they would be making breathing aids to help keep patients out of intensive care. Mercedes HPP created a device within a week. On the first day of production, Mercedes HPP manufactured 600 Continuous Positive Airway Pressure devices, with plans to increase this to 1,000 devices per day. These devices were being produced on machines that typically manufactured pistons and turbochargers for Formula 1 engines. Mercedes would go on to win the Drivers' and Constructors' championships in 2020.

Formula One engine results

List of Formula One engines and power units

See also
 Mercedes-Benz in motorsport

References

External links
 
 Profile at Grand Prix Encyclopedia

Companies established in 1983
Mercedes-Benz Group subsidiaries
AMG High Performance Powertrains
Formula One engine manufacturers
AMG High Performance Powertrains
Companies based in Northamptonshire
IndyCar Series engine manufacturers
Aston Martin in Formula One
Force India
Sauber Motorsport
Mercedes-Benz in Formula One
McLaren Group
Brawn GP